Taro Island is a small island in Solomon Islands with 507 inhabitants. It is the capital of Choiseul Province and is located in Choiseul Bay off the northwest coast.

Taro Island is home to the Choiseul Bay Airport, served by Solomon Airlines with flights to Gizo and other destinations.

In September 2012, groundbreaking for the construction of a police housing project began. The project will be supervised by the Choiseul Province police board, and will strengthen police presence on the island.

The island is very vulnerable to sea level rise. In 2016, John A. Church, Colin Woodroffe, and other Australian researchers from CSIRO predicted that Taro Island would become the first provincial capital globally to relocate residents and services due to the threat of sea level rise.

References

Populated places in the Solomon Islands
Islands of the Solomon Islands